Major General John Crawford Toomay (August 9, 1922 – March 12, 2008) was an American professional basketball player. He played for several teams in the Basketball Association of America and National Basketball Association. He averaged 6.7 points and 0.9 assists per game in 131 career games played.

Toomay holds the NBA record for the most personal fouls committed in a playoff game with 8. He later became a major general in the United States Air Force and was a key architect of nuclear defense strategies.

BAA/NBA career statistics

Regular season

Playoffs

References

External links

1922 births
2008 deaths
American men's basketball players
United States Army Air Forces personnel of World War II
Baltimore Bullets (1944–1954) players
Basketball players from California
People from Ontario, California
Centers (basketball)
Chicago Stags players
Denver Nuggets (1948–1950) players

Pacific Tigers men's basketball players
Providence Steamrollers players
Washington Capitols players
United States Army Air Forces officers
Military personnel from California